L3DT is a Windows application used to create maps and textures which can be used by artists and video game designers to generate 3D environments. The software was developed by Aaron Torpy, proprietor of Bundysoft. Both standard (free) and professional versions of the software can be found on the company's website.

Tools
L3DT has a number of tools which include generating and modifying heightmaps, generating textures and different types of texture maps, real-time 3D display of heightmaps and the ability to customize the software to suit your needs.

References

External links
 Official Website

3D graphics software